Samelson is a surname. Notable people with this surname include:

Franz Samelson (1923–2015), German-American psychologist
Hans Samelson (1916–2005), German-American mathematician
Klaus Samelson (1918–1980), German mathematician and physicist

See also
Samuelson